HighBeam Research was a paid search engine and full text online archive owned by Gale, a subsidiary of Cengage, for thousands of newspapers, magazines, academic journals, newswires, trade magazines, and encyclopedias in English. It was headquartered in Chicago, Illinois. In late 2018, the archive was shut down.

History 
The company was established in August 2002 after Patrick Spain, who had just sold Hoover's, which he had co-founded, bought eLibrary and Encyclopedia.com from Tucows. The new company was called Alacritude, LLC (a combination of Alacrity and Attitude). ELibrary had a library of 1,200 newspaper, magazine and radio/TV transcript archives that were generally not freely available.

Original investors included Prism Opportunity Fund of Chicago and 1 to 1 Ventures of Stamford, Connecticut.

Spain stated, "There was a glaring gap between free search like Google and high-end offerings like LexisNexis and Factiva."

Later in 2002, it bought Researchville.com. By 2003, it had increased its archive base to articles from 2,600 publishers. In 2004, it was renamed HighBeam Research. In 2005, it increased its publisher base to 3,500 publishers. In 2006, Oxford University Press, Knight Ridder and The Washington Post archives were added. In 2008, it was purchased by Gale, a subsidiary of Cengage. Highbeam featured many articles by the UK based Trinity Mirror Group.

Until late 2018, Highbeam Research was a partner in the Womensforum network and a major content provider for the WomensForum women's issues research website.

Highbeam Research shut down in late 2018 after 16 years.

References

External links 

 

2002 establishments in the United States
Cengage
Companies based in Chicago
Online mass media companies of the United States
Internet search engines
Online archives of the United States
Mass media companies established in 2002
Internet properties established in 2002
2008 mergers and acquisitions